The swimming competition at the 1993 Summer Universiade took place in Buffalo, United States from July 9 to July 14, 1993.

Men’s events

Women’s events

References

 
 
 Results of The 17th Universiade '93 Buffalo: Swimming (universiade.fjct.fit.ac.jp)

Swimming at the Summer Universiade
Uni
1993 Summer Universiade